Yi Chung-hwan (1690-1756) was a Joseon civil servant and geographer. He wrote the classic  (1751), describing places in Korea in detail, including provinces of Pyeong'an, Hamgyeong, Hwanghae, Gangwon, Gyeongsang, Jeolla, Chungcheong, and Gyeonggi.

References

External links
 

18th-century Korean writers
1690 births
1756 deaths
Korean geographers
People from Gongju